Samaraweera Asoka Ponnamperuma (born 3 May 1936 – died 2 April 1993 as අශෝක පොන්නම්පෙරුම) [Sinhala]) was an actor in Sri Lankan cinema as well as a singer, scriptwriter and filmmaker. Considered as "Sri Lanka's Sivaji Ganeshan", Ponnamperuma has acted more than 40 films in a career spanned for more than three decades.

Personal life
He was born on 3 May 1936 in Colombo. His father Don Charles Ponnamperuma was a journalist, who worked as editor-in-chief of the Buddhist paper Sinhala Bauddhaya in 1950. His mother was Premawansha Mithrawaththa. Ashoka completed his education from Ananda College.

He was married to a fellow film actress, Manel Lona Elizabeth Perera. The wedding was celebrated on 4 December 1965. Manel first acted in the film Deepashika and then appeared in few films such as Sihina Hathak, Sekaya, Layata Laya, Ruhunu Kumari and Sanda Nega Eddi. The couple has three sons - Anuradha, Sumedha, Chaminda and one daughter, Manjula. Asoka and Manel co-acted in few films such as Layata Laya, Dehadaka Duka, Ruhunu Kumari and London Hamu.

He died on 2 April 1993 at the age of 56 from heart attack. Although all funeral work is to be completed within 24 hours after his death, his request was unable to comply due to curfew in the country and the delay in the post mortem.

Career
At the age of 14, he started to act in school stage dramas. Then he mastered music under R. A. Chandrasena. He won the first place in all island music competition in that year, which got the attention from musician Lionel Edirisinghe. Asoka met his acting hero L. M. Perera in a tea shop and asked about acting in a film. After few days, he received a message about a role and moved to Colombo. In 1958, his maiden cinema acting came through the film Suneetha directed by P. Neelakantan with a dual role. Then he acted in many popular films such as Sihinaya, Sundara Birinda, Suwineetha Lalani, Ganthera and Samiya Birindage Deviyaya. In 1969, he won the award for the Best Supporting actor for the film Indunila at Sarasaviya Film Festival.

Asoka wrote the book Mal Manda Bisaw which is based on a true story about a prostitute that he met at Maradana Police Station. Then he wrote the book Ai Mata Mehema Une. By using the book, he script his first film direction Pradeepa which was screened on 2 July 1982.

Filmography

References

External links

Sri Lankan male film actors
Sinhalese male actors
1936 births
1993 deaths